Carlo Rosati (Livorno, 24 April 1876  – Pisa, 19 August 1929) was an Italian mathematician working on algebraic geometry who introduced the Rosati involution.

Notes

References

External links
Carlo Rosati in Mathematica Italiana
Carlo Rosati

1876 births
1929 deaths
Italian mathematicians
Academic staff of the University of Pisa